Hyotheriinae was a subfamily of even-toed ungulates that existed during the Miocene and Pliocene in Europe, Asia, and Africa.

Genera
†Aureliachoerus Ginsburg, 1974 - Miocene, Europe
†Chicochoerus Orliac et al., 2006 - Miocene, Europe 
†Chleuastochoerus Pearson, 1928 - Miocene and Pliocene, Asia
†Hyotherium von Meyer, 1834 -  Miocene, Europe and Asia
†Nguruwe Pickford, 1986 - (previously located in the subfamily of Kubanochoerinae) Miocene, Africa
†Xenohyus Ginsburg, 1980 - Miocene, Europe

References

Miocene even-toed ungulates
Neogene mammals of Asia
Fossil taxa described in 1888
Prehistoric Suidae
Mammal subfamilies